The Apertura 2007 Primera División de Fútbol Profesional season is the  since its establishment. The first fixtures of the season were played on August 11, 2007, and the season ended on 2007. A.D. Isidro Metapán are the defending Premiership champions, having won their First Premiership title. The first goalscorer of the season was, who scored an against Once Municipal.

Team promoted
 Nejapa F.C.

Stadium

Team information

Personnel and sponsoring

Managerial Changes

Before the season

During the season

Apertura 2007 Standings
Last updated April 5, 2008

Round 1

Round 2

Round 3

Round 4

Semifinals 1st Leg

Semifinals 2nd Leg

Final

C.D. Luis Ángel Firpo qualified for 2008–09 CONCACAF Champions League.

Top scorers

List of foreign players in the league
This is a list of foreign players in Apertura 2007. The following players:
have played at least one apetura game for the respective club.
have not been capped for the El Salvador national football team on any level, independently from the birthplace

A new rule was introduced this season that clubs can only have three foreign players per club and can only add a new player if there is an injury or player/s is released.

C.D. Águila
  Fabio Ulloa
  Nicolás Muñoz
  Glaucio lira

Alianza F.C.
  Arturo Albarrán

Chalatenango
  Anel Canales 
  Franklin Webster
  Marcelo Messias
  Juan Camilo Mejía

C.D. FAS
  Temistocles Perez
  Joel Solonilla
  Sebastian Bini
  Alejandro Bentos
  Orlando Rodriguez

C.D. Luis Ángel Firpo
  Patricio Barroche
  Fernando Leguizamón
  Leonardo Pekarnik 
  Mario Alejandro Costas

 (player released mid season)
 Injury replacement player

Nejapa FC
  Juan Carlos Reyes
  Roberto Chanampe
  Jose Luis Osorio
  Oscar Maturin

A.D. Isidro Metapán
  Marcelo Messias
   Johnny Avila
  Paolo Suarez
  Williams Reyes

Once Municipal
  Francisco Portillo
  Jairo Hurtado
  Ernesto Noel Aquino
  Libardo Barbajal
  Pablo Troyano

San Salvador F.C.
  Alexander Obregón
  Andrés Medina

Vista Hermosa
  José Eduardo Mendez
  Cristian Mosquera
  Elder Figueroa
  Luis Torres Rodriguez

External links
 https://web.archive.org/web/20070820233416/http://www.laprensagrafica.com/futbol/

Primera División de Fútbol Profesional Apertura seasons
El
1